Democracy-Dictatorship (DD), index of democracy and dictatorship or simply the DD index or the DD datasets was  the binary measure of democracy and dictatorship first proposed by Adam Przeworski et al. (2010), and further developed and maintained by Cheibub, Gandhi, and Vreeland (2009). Though the most recent data set is only updated for 2008, there is planning by Cheibub to update it to the present year.

Based on the regime binary classification idea proposed by Alvarez in 1996, and the Democracy and Development (or DD measure, ACLP dataset) proposed by Przeworski et al. (2010), Cheibub, Gandhi, and Vreeland developed a six-fold regime classification scheme, resulting what the authors called as the DD datasets.

The DD dataset covers the annual data points of 199 countries from 1946 (or date of independence) to 2008. The figures at the left show the results in 1988 and 2008.

Six-fold regime classification scheme and its rules
The DD index first classifies the regimes into two types: democracies and dictatorships. For democracies, it categorizes them into three types: parliamentary, semi-presidential and presidential democracies. For dictatorships, monarchic, military and civilian dictatorship.
"
Based on a "minimalist" theory of democracy, the index relies on rules regarding the existence of competitive elections. Resorting to democratic concepts by Karl Popper and Joseph Schumpeter, Przeworski defended the minimalist approach, citing Popper that "the only system in which citizens can get rid of governments without bloodshed."

Four rules 
For a regime to be considered as a democracy by the DD scheme, it must meet the requirement of four rules below:

Some regimes may meet the first three rules, but lack an alternation in power in its historical past; these regimes are classified as dictatorships because of cases where the incumbent only allows elections as long as they keep winning, and would refuse to step down if they lost. However, since they might also give up power willingly, the regime is marked with a type II value to signal potential classification errors where a democratic regime may be falsely classified as dictatorship.. This does not indicate cases of semi-democracy or semi-dictatorship.. The authors acknowledged that the last rule is more complicated to implement, but stated that it helps researchers to control potential errors and removes subjective judgement from the classification.

Countries 
The Democracy-Dictatorship Index has the main regime types of "democracy" and "dictatorship" and three sub-types for each as well. Democracies can be either parliamentary, semi-presidential, or presidential and dictatorships can be civilian, military, or royal. Many countries which are seen as otherwise democratic are dictatorships because there has yet to be an alternation in power since their incumbent government has never lost an election. Therefore, it is impossible to know if the regime is a democracy or a dictatorship, so DD Index considers them dictatorships until an alternation in power occurs.

Democracy classification 

Democracies are classified by the rules in which executives can be appointed or removed and can be either presidential, mixed or semi-presidential, or parliamentary. It is important to note that these names do not have to correspond to the official or colloquial titles of any of the countries offices. For example, DD could classify a country which has a legislative assembly whose official name is "the parliament" but still classify it in any of the three categories. The classification depends on the rules outlining the relationship between a country's government, legislative assembly (often called the legislature), and head of state. The government composes the chief executive and the heads of the executive departments. The chief executive can take many names including chancellor, prime minister, or premier and the heads of the executive departments can bear different names and be called different things. In the United Kingdom, for example, the chief executive is the prime minister, and the ministers are the heads of the executive departments, which together compose the government.

Legislative responsibility 
The first distinction made is whether a country has a government has legislative responsibility, i.e. whether a majority vote in the legislature can remove the sitting government without cause. The required majority needed to remove the sitting government varies between countries but is termed a vote of no confidence. Some countries (such as Spain, Belgium, Germany, and Israel) require that the vote of no confidence also specify who is going to replace the sitting government to minimize the time without an interim government, essentially replacing one government with another. This type of vote is termed a constructive vote of no confidence. Sometimes sitting governments will attach a vote of no confidence clause to a piece of legislation they want passed, effectively tying the survival of the government on the piece of legislation.

Head of state 
The second distinction made is whether the head of state is popularly elected for a fixed term. The head of state may be unelected and still be classified as a democracy. Popularly elected means that the head of state is directly elected by the citizens or elected by an assembly which then elects them (an example being the electoral college in the United States). In Germany, the head of state is elected by regional legislatures and not popularly elected. Elected heads of state are usually referred to as "president." The phrase "fixed term" indicates the once the head of state is chosen, they serve a known and a limited number of years before another election is held, and they cannot be removed from the office in the meantime via a vote of no confidence.

The head of state in most parliamentary democracies formally appoint the head of government. Some countries, such as Greece and Bulgaria, stipulate who the head of state chooses as head of government. In the former, for example, the President must appoint as Prime Minister the leader of the largest party in parliament, who has three days to gain the confidence of a majority thereof.

Some countries, such as Sweden, instead charge another person entirely with choosing the head of government, such as the presiding officer of the legislative assembly.

Classification 
The first distinction made is whether a democracy's government is responsible to the legislature. If it is not responsible, it is a presidential democracy. If it is, then a further distinction is made between democracies where the head of state is popularly elected and those where the head of state is not popularly elected. If the head of state is popularly elected for a fixed term then, the democracy is mixed or semi-presidential. If the head of state serves for life or is not popularly elected or a fixed term, then the democracy is parliamentary.

The table below offers a full list of which countries are what type of democracy. Keep note that the head of state, chief executive, government, and legislatures can have their official names be seemingly contradictory to this classification. The name a democracy gives itself or its office does not indicate what type of democracy it is.

Definitions 
A presidential democracy has a government that does not need the majority support of a legislature to stay in power. A semi-presidential (mixed) democracy has a government that needs the majority of support from a legislature to exist and whose head of state is popularly elected for a fixed term. Parliamentary democracy is the same as semi-presidential but has heads of state which are not popularly elected for a fixed term, typically either monarchs or officials not chosen by popular elections.

Comparison with other democracy-measuring data sets 
The DD dataset is limited to 199 countries after 1946, whereas Boix, Miller, & Rosato, 2013 proposed a data set from 1800 to 2007, covering 219 countries. The 2010 version of Polity data series covers 189 countries from 1800 to 2009.

Gugiu & Centellas developed the Democracy Cluster Classification Index that integrates five democracy indicators (including the DD dataset, Polity dataset), clustering 24 American and 39 European regimes over 30 years.

See also 
 Democracy Index
 List of democracy indices
 Polity data series

References

External links
 DD dataset and citations 
 ACLP datsset and citations
 Przeworski, Alvarez, Cheibub, and Limongi: Democracy and development From WikiSummary, the Free Social Science Summary Database

Democracy
Research
International rankings
Dictatorship
Political science